1997 Cerezo Osaka season

Competitions

Domestic results

J.League

Emperor's Cup

J.League Cup

Player statistics

 † player(s) joined the team after the opening of this season.

Transfers

In:

Out:

Transfers during the season

In
Claudinho (on July)
Alex Lopes de Nascimento (on July)
Takeaki Yuhara (on July)
Makoto Fukuyama (on July)

Out
Shinichi Sato (loan to Sagan Tosu on January)
Gilmar (on July)
Manoel (to Botafogo on July)

Awards
none

References
J.LEAGUE OFFICIAL GUIDE 1997, 1997 
J.LEAGUE OFFICIAL GUIDE 1998, 1996 
J.LEAGUE YEARBOOK 1999, 1999 
 ヒストリー ｜ セレッソ大阪 CEREZO OSAKA OFFICIAL SITE

Other pages
 J. League official site
 Cerezo Osaka official site

Cerezo Osaka
Cerezo Osaka seasons